This is a list of schools in Sha Tin District, Hong Kong.

Secondary schools

 Government
 Helen Liang Memorial Secondary School (Shatin)
 Sha Tin Government Secondary School

 Aided
 Baptist Lui Ming Choi Secondary School (浸信會呂明才中學)
 Buddhist Kok Kwong Secondary School (佛教覺光法師中學)
 Buddhist Wong Man Tin College (佛教黃允畋中學)
 Caritas Ma On Shan Secondary School (明愛馬鞍山中學)
 Chinese YMCA College (青年會書院)
 Chiu Chow Association Secondary School (潮州會館中學)
 Christ College (基督書院)
 Christian Alliance Cheng Wing Gee College (香港九龍塘基督教中華宣道會鄭榮之中學)
 CUHKFAA Chan Chun Ha Secondary School (香港中文大學校友會聯會陳震夏中學)
 GCC&ITKD Lau Pak Lok Secondary School (東莞工商總會劉百樂中學)
 HKCWC Fung Yiu King Memorial Secondary School (香港中國婦女會馮堯敬紀念中學)
 Immaculate Heart of Mary College (聖母無玷聖心書院)
 Jockey Club Ti-I College (賽馬會體藝中學)
 Kiangsu-Chekiang College (Shatin) (沙田蘇浙公學)
 Kwok Tak Seng Catholic Secondary School (天主教郭得勝中學)
 Lock Tao Secondary School (樂道中學)
 Lok Sin Tong Young Ko Hsiao Lin Secondary School (樂善堂楊葛小琳中學)
 Ma On Shan St Joseph's Secondary School (馬鞍山聖若瑟中學)
 Ma On Shan Tsung Tsin Secondary School (馬鞍山崇真中學)
 Ng Yuk Secondary School (五育中學)
 Pentecostal Lam Hon Kwong School (五旬節林漢光中學)
 PLK C W Chu College (保良局朱敬文中學)
 PLK Wu Chung College (保良局胡忠中學)
 Pok Oi Hospital Chan Kai Memorial College (博愛醫院陳楷紀念中學)
 Sha Tin Methodist College (沙田循道衞理中學)
 Shatin Pui Ying College (沙田培英中學)
 Shatin Tsung Tsin Secondary School (沙田崇真中學)
 SKH Lam Kau Mow Secondary School (聖公會林裘謀中學)
 SKH Tsang Shiu Tim Secondary School (聖公會曾肇添中學)
 St Rose of Lima's College (聖羅撒書院)
 Toi Shan Association College (台山商會中學)
 Tsang Pik Shan (Sung Lan) Secondary School (曾璧山（崇蘭）中學)
 TWGH Mrs Fung Wong Fung Ting College (東華三院馮黃鳳亭中學)
 TWGH Wong Fung Ling College (東華三院黃鳳翎中學)
 TWGH Yow Kam Yuen College (東華三院邱金元中學)
 YCH Tung Chi Ying Memorial Secondary School (仁濟醫院董之英紀念中學)

 Direct Subsidy Scheme
 HKBUAS Wong Kam Fai Secondary & Primary School (香港浸會大學附屬學校王錦輝中小學)
 Lam Tai Fai College (林大輝中學)
 Li Po Chun United World College
 Piu Kiu College (培僑書院)
 Stewards Pooi Kei College (香港神託會培基書院)
 Tak Sun Secondary School (德信中學)

 English Schools Foundation
 Island School
 Sha Tin College

 Private
 International Christian School
 PLK & Sprouts Foundation Secondary Education Service Center (保良局思培基金中學教育服務中心)
 Renaissance College (啓新書院)
 Shatin Lutheran Evening School (路德會沙田夜校)

Primary schools

 Government
 Sha Tin Government Primary School (沙田官立小學)

 Aided
 Baptist (Sha Tin Wai) Lui Ming Choi Primary School (浸信會沙田圍呂明才小學)
 Baptist Lui Ming Choi Primary School (浸信會呂明才小學)
 Carmel Alison Lam Primary School (迦密愛禮信小學)
 Chi Hong Primary School (慈航學校)
 Christian Alliance H C Chan Primary School (香港九龍塘基督教中華宣道會陳元喜小學)
 CUHKFAA Thomas Cheung School (香港中文大學校友會聯會張煊昌學校)
 Dr Catherine F Woo Memorial School (胡素貞博士紀念學校)
 Free Methodist Bradbury Chun Lei Primary School (循理會白普理基金循理小學)
 Free Methodist Mei Lam Primary School (循理會美林小學)
 HCC&ITKD Cheong Wong Wai Primary School (東莞工商總會張煌偉小學)
 HKTA Shun Yeung Primary School (香港道教聯合會純陽小學)
 Immaculate Heart of Mary School (聖母無玷聖心學校)
 KCBC Hay Nien (Yan Ping) Primary School (九龍城浸信會禧年（恩平）小學)
 Kowloon City Baptist Church Hay Nien Primary School (九龍城浸信會禧年小學)
 Leung Kui Kau Lutheran Primary School (路德會梁鉅鏐小學)
 LKWFS Wong Yiu Nam Primary School (世界龍岡學校黃耀南小學)
 Ma On Shan Ling Liang Primary School (馬鞍山靈糧小學)
 Ma On Shan Methodist Primary School (馬鞍山循道衛理小學)
 Ma On Shan St. Joseph's Primary School (馬鞍山聖若瑟小學)
 Ng Clan's Association Tai Pak Memorial School (吳氏宗親總會泰伯紀念學校)
 PLK Chee Jing Yin Primary School (保良局朱正賢小學)
 PLK Chong Kee Ting Primary School (保良局莊啟程小學)
 PLK Dr. Jimmy Wong Chi-ho (Tin Sum Valley) Primary School (保良局王賜豪（田心谷）小學)
 PLK Riverain Primary School (保良局雨川小學)
 PLK Siu Hon-sum Primary School (保良局蕭漢森小學)
 Sa Tin Ka Ping School (救世軍田家炳學校)
 Sha Tin Methodist Primary School (沙田循道衛理小學)
 Sha Tin Wai Dr. Catherine F. Woo Memorial School (沙田圍胡素貞博士紀念學校)
 Shatin Tsung Tsin School (沙田崇真學校)
 SKH Holy Spirit Primary School (聖公會主風小學)
 SKH Ma On Shan Holy Spirit Primary School (聖公會馬鞍山主風小學
 Stewards Pooi Kei Primary School (培基小學)
 The ELCHK Ma On Shan Lutheran Primary School (基督教香港信義會馬鞍山信義學校)
 The ELCHK Wo Che Lutheran School (基督教香港信義會禾輋信義學校)
 The Little Flower's Catholic Primary School (天主教聖華學校)
 TWGH Sin Chu Wan Primary School (東華三院冼次雲小學)
 TWGHS Tsoi Wing Sing Primary School (東華三院蔡榮星小學)

 Direct Subsidy Scheme
 Hong Kong Baptist University Affiliated School Wong Kam Fai Secondary and Primary School (香港浸會大學附屬學校王錦輝中小學)
  (培僑書院)

 English Schools Foundation
 Shatin Junior School

 Private
 Anfield School (安菲爾學校)
 International Christian School
 Renaissance College

Special schools

 Aided
 Caritas Lok Jun School (明愛樂進學校)
 Caritas Resurrection School (明愛樂群學校)
 Choi Jun School (才俊學校)
 Hong Kong Red Cross Hospital Schools Prince of Wales Hospital (香港紅十字會醫院學校)
 SAHK Ko Fook Iu Memorial School (香港耀能協會高福耀紀念學校)
 Shatin Public School (沙田公立學校)

Former schools
 Government
  (育才中學（沙田）)

References

Lists of schools in Hong Kong
Sha Tin District